The 2023 Columbus mayoral election will be held on November 7, 2023 to elect the mayor of Columbus, Ohio. Incumbent Democratic mayor Andrew Ginther is running for re-election to a third term in office. A primary election would have been held in May, but because only two candidates qualified for the race, both will advance directly to the November general election. The election will be officially nonpartisan.

Candidates

Declared 
 Andrew Ginther, incumbent mayor (Party affiliation: Democratic)
 Joe Motil, community activist (Party affiliation: Independent)

Disqualified 
 Carrie Griffin (Party affiliation: Republican)

Results

References

External links
Official campaign websites
 Andrew Ginther (D) for Mayor

Mayoral elections in Columbus, Ohio
2023 Ohio elections
Columbus